Lyssarea (before 1927: Μπουγιάτι Bougiati) is a village in Southwestern Arcadia, Greece. It is part of the municipal unit of Iraia. It is built on the slopes of two hills called Agios Lias and Skylaras and appears amphitheatric with its old stone houses and tile roofs. The oldest dated house in Lyssarea was built in 1787. The majority of old inhabitants were builders (Greek χτιστάδες/μαστόροι). It is 4 km northwest of Paloumpa, 4 km south of Kalliani and 12 km northwest of Dimitsana.

Population
130 (1981), 227 (1991), 177 (2001), 68 (2011).

References

External links
 Lyssarea homepage 

Populated places in Arcadia, Peloponnese